The Anglo-Thai Foundation is UK Registered charity No. 1000093, and makes annual grants to bright schoolchildren and students from the poorest families in Isan, Thailand to ensure they are able to attend school and complete the education provided by the state.

The children are chosen by the head teachers of their schools and are supported from primary level through secondary school and on, if they make the grade, to college and university. In 2012/2013 378 schoolchildren and students were receiving grants.

When funds allow, grants are also made to schools to provide clean drinking water systems. Hardship grants are made to particularly distressed families to help them cope with disease, misfortune and disability.

The charity is wholly dependent for its finance on donations, sponsorship and fundraising activities.

History
The Anglo-Thai Foundation was founded in 1990 at the Buddhapadipa temple in Wimbledon, UK on the initiative of a Thai bhikkhu (Buddhist monk), Chaokhun Phra Panyabuddhiwithet (Dr Phramaha Laow Panyasiri), and Peter Robinson, an English Buddhist.

Chaokhun Phra Panyabuddhiwithet recalls, "I was always sad that I had not been able to study more as a child, and now I wanted to help other children in my village who were in a similar situation".

At first the foundation focused on providing education grants for the poorest children in the young monk's home village of Nongrang, Sisaket Province. "We decided to raise funds to finance a well to provide the village with clean water, a community centre, and extra land for the school. We built a kindergarten and paid for lunch for all the children attending it. We built cells for the monks in the village to live in. In the UK we found generous sponsors, not all of them Buddhists by any means, and were able to ask a local teacher to write to schools in many different villages to ask which children were most in need of help".

The foundation prospered, and with generous donations and a growing number of sponsors, was able to expand its work to provinces beyond Sisaket. It now helps schoolchildren and students from several provinces of Isan, irrespective of religious allegiance or non-allegiance.

Grants to schoolchildren, students, families in hardship and projects in 2012/13 totaled £60,000 (฿2.85 million).

References

External links
The Anglo-Thai Foundation web page

Organizations established in 1990
Foundations based in England
Children's charities based in England
Foreign charities operating in Thailand
1990 establishments in the United Kingdom